The black-tailed gerbil (Gerbilliscus nigricaudus) is a species of rodent found in Ethiopia, Kenya, Somalia, and Tanzania. Its natural habitats are dry savanna, subtropical or tropical dry shrubland, and arable land.

References

Gerbilliscus
Mammals described in 1878
Taxonomy articles created by Polbot